The ArmaLite AR-18 is a gas-operated assault rifle chambered for 5.56×45mm NATO ammunition. The AR-18 was designed at ArmaLite in California by Arthur Miller, Eugene Stoner, George Sullivan, and Charles Dorchester in 1963 as an alternative to the Colt AR-15 design, a variant of which had just been selected by the U.S. military as the M16. A semi-automatic version known as the AR-180 was later produced for the civilian market. While the AR-18 was never adopted as the standard service rifle of any nation, its production license was sold to companies in Japan and the United Kingdom, and it is said to have influenced many later weapons such as the British SA80, the Singaporean SAR-80 and SR-88, the American Adaptive Combat Rifle, the Belgian FN F2000, the Japanese Howa Type 89 and the German Heckler and Koch G36.

Background

Soon after the adoption of the 7.62×51mm NATO M14 rifle in 1957, the U.S. Army's Continental Army Command (CONARC) began an investigation of small-caliber, high-velocity (SCHV) rifles as an offshoot of the military's existing research program, Project SALVO. ArmaLite and Winchester Arms were solicited by CONARC to provide prototype automatic rifles chambered for high-velocity centerfire .22 rounds. The ArmaLite AR-15 was a scaled-down version of the 7.62mm AR-10, which had appeared too late to be a serious contender against the M14 for adoption by the US Army. Its competitor was the Winchester .224 Light Rifle, a "Carbine" Williams prototype carbine design in a .22 high velocity round which was similar to, but not interchangeable with, the .223 Remington (5.56×45mm). During the protracted U.S. military trials of the AR-15, ArmaLite's corporate owners Fairchild essentially gave up on the design, and sold the AR-15 production rights to Colt. Fairchild also spun off ArmaLite as an independent company, allowing the new owners to buy all of the company's designs except for the AR-10 and AR-15. When the U.S. military ultimately selected the AR-15 as the M16, ArmaLite could no longer profit from its adoption.

The ArmaLite AR-16 appeared in the later 1950s. The AR-16, a 7.62mm NATO selective-fire rifle, was Eugene Stoner's final design for ArmaLite. The AR-16 and its predecessor, the AR-12 were designed by Stoner in response to demands by the military forces of smaller, less developed nations for a less expensive, yet state-of-the-art selective-fire military rifle that unlike the AR-10 and AR-15, could be produced inexpensively of heavy-gauge sheet metal using automatic screw machines, lathes, and presses. The AR-12 originally featured a direct-impingement (DI) gas operation system, but this was changed to a more conventional short-stroke gas piston in the AR-16 after ArmaLite sold the production rights to the DI system to Colt Firearms. The AR-16 had a short, 15-inch barrel, hinged wooden butt, and weighed 8.75 pounds empty; only three examples were built. Eugene Stoner left ArmaLite in 1961, shortly before Fairchild divested itself of ownership.

The U.S. military's later adoption of the AR-15 gave legitimacy to its 5.56mm cartridge, and ArmaLite sought to develop a competing design chambered in 5.56mm that did not infringe on the Colt license agreement. With Stoner gone, it was decided to scale down the AR-16, and ArmaLite's new chief designer, Arthur Miller, embarked on the project. The resulting 5.56mm design appeared in 1963 and was named the AR-18. Miller later received  for the rifle in 1969.

Construction and design
Overall, the new AR-18 rifle is much more conventional than previous ArmaLite designs, although it uses the relatively new stamped steel construction from its predecessor, the AR-16. Despite being pioneered by the Germans during WW2 in weapons such as the MP 44, and later adopted for the Soviet AKM, the use of stamped and welded sheet metal components was still uncommon in the manufacture of military rifles in the West in the early 1960s, which had, until then, largely retained the use of traditional machined forgings. Compared to the smooth lines of the AR-15, the AR-18 faced criticism over its stamped and welded construction, which had demonstrably greater tolerances in parts fit. Its simple construction promised significantly reduced production costs, and allowed it to be license-produced locally on less advanced machinery, potentially reducing dependence on foreign manufacturers.

The AR-18's action is powered by a short-stroke gas piston above the barrel. The gas piston is of three-piece design to facilitate disassembly, with a hollow forward section with four radial gas vent holes fitting around a stainless steel gas block projecting rearwards from the foresight housing. The gas is vented from the barrel and travelled via a vent through the foresight housing into the hollow front section of the piston, which causes it to move rearwards a short distance. The rear end of the piston emerges through the barrel extension to contact the forward face of the bolt carrier, causing it in turn to move rearwards. The bolt itself is of similar configuration to the AR-15 with seven radial locking lugs engaging corresponding recesses in the barrel extension, and the extractor in place of the eighth lug. The bolt is moved into and out of the locked position via a cam pin that engaged a helical slot in the bolt carrier, which rides on two metal guide rods (each with its own return spring) instead of contacting the receiver walls, providing additional clearance for foreign matter entering the receiver. Unlike the AR-15, the cocking handle fits directly into a recess in the bolt carrier and reciprocates with it during firing, allowing the firer to force the breech closed or open if necessary. The cocking handle slot has a spring-loaded cover that can be closed by the user to prevent debris entering the receiver, and it will open automatically as the bolt carrier moves rearwards after the first shot. The recoil springs are housed within the receiver, differing from the AR-15 which houses its more elaborate buffer mechanism in the buttstock. The AR-18's compact design enables the use of a side-folding stock with a hinging mechanism (which proved to be less than adequately rigid).

The sights are of similar design and sight picture to those of the AR-15 - a 2-position flip aperture rear sight and post foresight - but the rear sight is made of stampings. A notable change is the use of a more conventional lower sight line closer to the axis of the bore, in contrast to the elevated sights of the AR-15. A dovetail is spot welded to the receiver in front of the rear sight for a proprietary ArmaLite quick-detachable scope mount.

The magazines were of a brand new proprietary design and were different than those of the AR-15. The original magazines made by ArmaLite and Howa were of gray-anodized aluminum alloy with black-plastic followers and came in 5- and 20-round capacities. (The 5-round magazine, like that of the Colt AR-15 Sporter, was just a full-size 20-round magazine blocked to only hold 5 rounds.) They lacked the magazine-catch cutouts of the AR-15 magazines, making them incompatible. Sterling later produced black-enameled steel magazines in 20- 30- and 40-round capacities that did have cutouts and were able to feed from an AR-15. However, the AR-18/AR-180 was never capable of using the Colt AR-15/M16's stock 20- or 30-round STANAG magazines. Gunsmiths have been able to convert AR-15/M16 magazines to feed in the AR-18, but they have to have modified followers or it will put strain on the bolt catch.

The AR-18 was also designed to use the same standard accessories as the M16. It used a three-pronged flash-hider that was similar to that used on the early M16. This was usually replaced by an aftermarket enclosed M16A1 "birdcage"-type model. It could mount the standard M-7 bayonet, although it was not available for sale through ArmaLite. "Sporterized" late-production Howa-made AR-180 rifles had extended metal tabs through the mounting lugs to prevent this. A plastic copy of the fixed folding metal bipod issued with the early M-16 was available and came in a similar protective case. AR-180 users were leery of buying a non-adjustable bipod made of thermoset plastic so few were sold, making it a rare accessory today. A padded rifle case that could carry the rifle with the scope mounted was available. It could hold two spare 20-round magazines and the bipod or bayonet in pouches.

Overall, the design is simple and effective with some clever touches; for example the bolt guide rod assembly guides the bolt in the receiver, retains the recoil springs and the rear end of the top handguard, as well as serving as the latch holding the upper and lower receivers together in the closed position. Disassembly is somewhat similar to the AR-15, with the working parts accessed by the rifle pivoting open on a hinge pin immediately forward of the magazine well.

Production

The AR-18 was put into limited production at ArmaLite's machine shop and offices in Costa Mesa, California. A semi-automatic version of the AR-18 known as the AR-180 was later produced for the civilian market between 1969 and 1972. ArmaLite was never equipped to build small arms on a production basis, and the Costa Mesa AR-18 and AR-180 rifles frequently show evidence of hand-fitting. A production license was granted to Nederlandsche Wapen-en Munitiefabriek (NWM) of Den Bosch, the Netherlands, but it is doubtful that any AR-18 rifles were actually produced there. A license to produce the AR-18/180 was then sold to Howa Machinery Co., of Japan, and the rifle was produced from 1970 until 1974, when new controls on export of military arms by the Japanese government forced the company to cease all small arms production. Between 1975 and 1978, there was a brief pause in production as ArmaLite was finalizing an agreement with Sterling Armaments Company to produce the rifle under license. From 1979 until 1985, the Sterling Armaments Company of Dagenham, Essex, in the United Kingdom produced the AR-18 and AR-180. In 1983, ArmaLite was sold to Elisco Tool & Manufacturing of the Philippines, which planned to pitch the AR-18 as a replacement for the license-produced M16A1 then in service with the Armed Forces of the Philippines. As a result, production stopped in 1985 as the tooling was sent to the Philippines. Under Elisco several modifications to the design were implemented and twenty (20) prototypes of four designated types (AR 101, AR 102, AR 103, AR 104) were built and underwent testing and evaluation. About 3,500 of these rifles, collectively designated the AR Series 100 were approved for production. Production plans for the AR Series 100 would fail to push through as Elisco would be dissolved and its assets liquidated in the late 1980s. In mid-1968 ArmaLite set up pilot production in its Costa Mesa plant producing 1,171 AR-18s and 4,018 AR-180s between 1969 and 1972. Howa produced 3,927 AR-180s between 1970 and 1974. Sterling manufactured 12,362 AR-180s between 1979 and 1985. In all, just 21,478 AR-180s were manufactured over 16 years of production between 1969 and 1985.

Operational use
Unlike the AR-15/M16, the AR-18 did not see substantial sales success, and was never officially adopted by any country as its standard service rifle. The reasons for this are unclear, but may have had something to do with the existing sales popularity of the AR-15/M16, as well as the need for additional field testing and evaluation of the Costa Mesa-produced rifles, which were still in the advanced prototype stage. The AR-18 was purchased for evaluation trials by various armed forces, including the United States (1964) and the United Kingdom (1966). These suffered various malfunctions during evaluation trials by various nations. During the US trials at Aberdeen Proving Ground in 1964, the AR-18's functioning was found to vary from lot to lot of ammunition. The evaluating board concluded that while the basic design of the AR-18 was sound, it required additional minor revisions and changes to improve safety and reliability before it could be considered for adoption as a service rifle. The British Ministry of Defence (MOD) tested the AR-18 in March 1966, and found the design unsatisfactory in performance during mud and sand trials. ArmaLite made several minor production modifications to the design commencing in 1965, and the U.S. Army was directed to re-evaluate the AR-18 at the end of 1969. Testing was conducted at Aberdeen Proving Grounds, conducted by arsenal employees and the Infantry Board at Fort Benning, Georgia. However, American procurement officials were not interested in acquiring yet another 5.56 mm service rifle. A number of deficiencies were listed and the testing authority stated that, although the AR-18 had military potential, it needed further development. In 1968, dissatisfied with efforts to market the AR-18, Arthur Miller left ArmaLite.

Instead, the AR-180 was sold on the civilian market, while the AR-18 sold in small quantities to police and law enforcement organizations, as well as armies and security forces of nations such as Botswana, Haiti, Malaysia and Swaziland. Still others found their way into the hands of paramilitary groups, such as the Provisional Irish Republican Army (IRA) in Northern Ireland, (see also Provisional IRA arms importation). The ArmaLite rifle was for many years the most lethal weapon available to the IRA. For this reason, it became an iconic symbol within that movement. The Republican ballad "Little Armalite" tells of how the AR-18 changed the fortunes of the organization in its conflict with Britain. The Armalite company reportedly bought 1000 copies of a recording for its salesmen to distribute. The 1980s Republican political strategy of parallel political and paramilitary campaigns was also christened the "Armalite and ballot box strategy".

Variants

The standard AR-18 versions manufactured by ArmaLite, Howa and Sterling Armaments Company differ only in minor details. ArmaLite and Howa rifles have a satin grey phosphate finish, while Sterling rifles sported two finishes; Serial numbers S15001 through S20000 had a black, glossy enamel painted finish. Starting with serial number S20001, a blued finish was used for the remainder of production. Rifles were normally equipped with a sling, cleaning kit (bore/brush), and a knife-type bayonet with scabbard. An optional bipod with a case was available.

The AR-180 is capable of semi-automatic fire only and was externally identical in appearance to the AR-18 with one exception; the selector has only two positions, omitting the third "AUTO" position found on the AR-18. There are minor differences between the variants; to select "FIRE" on the Howa rifles the selector lever must be pivoted 180 degrees from "SAFE" so it is pointing forward towards the muzzle (where "AUTO" would be on a selective-fire rifle), while on the Sterling rifles, the "SEMI" position is the same as the "SEMI" position on a selective-fire rifle; 90 degrees from "SAFE" with the selector lever pointing down. Towards the end of AR-180 production at ArmaLite's Costa Mesa shop in 1972, some unused AR-18 lowers were used to assemble AR-180s. The "SEMI" and "AUTO" positions were scrubbed and the "AUTO" position was relabeled "FIRE". The selector lever on these particular rifles would have to be pivoted 180 degrees from "SAFE" to "FIRE" the same way as Howa manufactured rifles.

Sterling made an AR-180 sporter variant called the "Sharpshooter". It was identical to the regular AR-180 except it came with black neoprene covers for the forend and buttstock. The forend cover gave the shooter a positive gripping surface and the buttstock cover contained a cheekpiece pad to help gain a full cheekweld when shooting.

Sterling manufactured a small number of sporter variants called the AR-180 SCS, of which only 385 were reputed to have been made. It has a large single-piece wooden thumbhole stock that replaces the butt, pistol grip and handguard of conventional versions. The metal parts differ in the lack of the ejection port cover, a PH prefix to the serial number and adapted safety and magazine release controls.

Sterling also manufactured small numbers of a short version, the AR-18S. The shortened barrel is fitted with a cone-shaped flash suppressor to address the additional muzzle flash resulting from the short barrel. Some examples have an additional pistol grip fitted to the underside of the handguard.

Sterling had also planned to market a pistol version of the AR-18S to complement the standard AR-180, known as the AR-180SP. A single prototype AR-180SP was completed and submitted to the ATF in 1982 to determine if it was suitable for importation, but it is not known if it was ever approved for import or if any more examples were imported beyond the lone prototype sent to ATF.

A 2.75× 20 mm telescopic sight was available but few were sold. Early-production models are marked in meters rather than yards and have a different reticle. It is marked "ArmaLite", and has a quick-detachable, see-through mount that attaches to an integral dovetail spot-welded to the top of the receiver. The mount could also feasibly be used with other scopes if they had a 1-inch diameter tube.

 AR-18 - Assault rifle
 AR-180 - Semi-automatic sporting rifle
 AR-180 SCS - Semi-automatic sporting rifle with wooden thumbhole stock
 AR-18S - Semi-automatic short barrel carbine
 AR-180SP - semi-automatic pistol
 AR-18 LSW - Light Support Weapon (LSW) prototype with a quick barrel change capability and completed a calibre conversion to 7.62x39mm

A delayed blowback upper was also developed by Ross Rudd using a hesitation lock but not manufactured due to financial backing reasons.

Later developments
The ArmaLite brand was purchased in 1996 by Eagle Arms, a U.S. small arms manufacturer, which adopted the ArmaLite brand for its company. An updated model of the AR-180 was introduced in 2001 as the AR-180B, with a molded polymer lower receiver replacing the stamped steel original. The new lower receiver is combined with the buttstock, which is fixed on the AR-180B, instead of the side-folding butt on the original AR-18 and AR-180. Other AR-180B changes include the use of standard AR-15 trigger group and rear sight parts, a straight cocking handle replacing the earlier cranked style and the deletion of the original AR-18/180 spring-loaded dust cover for the cocking handle slot. The AR-15 magazine release is also used, in contrast to the original AR-18 which had a different magazine release and corresponding slot in the body of the magazine, meaning AR-15 magazines needed a new slot cut to fit properly in the AR-18. As a result, the AR-180B uses standard AR-15/M16 magazines. An AR-180B version with a Picatinny rail was planned for production. In 2007 the AR-180B was discontinued due to poor sales.

There are aftermarket parts to improve the AR-180B. NoDak Spud made a replacement black-anodized aluminum-alloy lower-receiver. StormWerkz made a series of stock adapters compatible with this model of lower receiver to allow the use of fixed or folding AR-180B or AR-15 stocks. StormWerkz also made an adapter that allowed the use of a Picatinny rail that comes in four variants and installs over the dovetail on the top of the receiver.

The Canadian company Wolverine Supplies teamed up with Canadian gunmaker Kodiak Defence to commission the creation of a new AR-180 variant, the WK180-C. The WK180-C does away with the stamped steel and polymer construction of the AR-18, AR-180, and AR-180B, instead, it uses 6061-T6 aluminium to form the upper and lower receivers. This rifle ships with an adaptor to mount AR-15 style stocks (and comes with a collapsible AR15 stock). As Length of pull (LOP) is long with many AR15 stocks, some users have retrofit Cz Vz58 folding stocks to these rifles. While this option works well, it requires the use of lower iron sights and optics.

In 2019 Brownells, Inc. released BRN-180 complete upper assembly, a new take on the AR-180 design built around the AR-18 short-stroke piston system. The BRN-180 is designed to be fitted to mil-spec AR-15 lower receivers and unlike standard AR-15s the BRN-180 can be fired with the stock folded. The BRN-180 comes with an adjustable gas block and a free-floating modular handguard and is available in  barrel lengths.

Influence 
When the AR-18 was designed, a plethora of different methods of gas and recoil operation existed in self-loading intermediate caliber rifles. Since then, self-loading intermediate caliber rifles have converged toward three methods of gas operation. These are: AR-15 style direct Impingement, the AK-style long stroke gas piston and the short-stroke gas system found in the AR-18 rifle. While the AK and AR-15 are the first and second most produced intermediate caliber rifles of all time, the AR-18 gas system is the ancestor for the majority of short stroke gas systems found in selective fire military rifles. The AR-18 mechanism is the basis for many rifles in major military service. Rifles which use a copy or derivative of the AR-18 gas system include: German HK G36, HK416, FN F2000, FN-SCAR, Steyr AUG, CZ 805 BREN, Chinese QBZ-95, Daewoo K1, HOWA Type 89, SAR-88, T-91 and British SA80 family of weapon systems.

In some cases, designs borrow more than just the AR-18's gas system. Successive rifle designs borrow other components such as the bolt carrier group or upper receiver. The HOWA Type 89 is an AR-18, modernized to fit the needs of the Japan Self-Defense Forces. The Singapore SAR-88 and Taiwanese T-91 utilize a complete AR-18 upper receiver. Early British SA80 prototypes featured ArmaLite produced AR-18 upper receivers mated to a prototype stamped metal bullpup lower receiver. The finalized SA80 weapon systems use the AR-18 gas system and bolt carrier group. The Remington Adaptive Combat Rifle derives its bolt carrier group from the AR-18.

Users

 
 
 : Used by the Royal Malaysian Air Force.

For trials

 : Tested at least two AR-18s for consideration to the Imperial Iranian Army, but was never adopted.

Non-state users
 Provisional Irish Republican Army
 Lebanese Forces militia – Used in small numbers by Commando units.

See also
List of ArmaLite rifles
Howa Type 89 - Japanese version of ArmaLite AR-18
SAR-87 - British/Singaporean version of ArmaLite AR-18

References

External links

5.56 mm assault rifles
Abandoned military projects of the United States
Weapons and ammunition introduced in 1969
Police weapons
Short stroke piston firearms